The following is a list of characters in Portal and Portal 2, both developed and published by the Valve.

Humans

Chell

Chell is the player-character in both Portal games. She is a silent protagonist outside of small grunts during physical tasks. Very little truthful information is known about Chell; while GLaDOS makes many statements to Chell's background and history, GLaDOS herself admits she is unreliable. The only consistent fact that is used through the series is that Chell's parents gave her away. Whether they did it intentionally or not is unknown.

Doug Rattmann

Doug Rattmann, often referred to as the "Ratman" is a character in both Portal and Portal 2. He was a former scientist working at Aperture and one of the few who survived when GLaDOS flooded the facility with neurotoxin. In the two games there are various "Ratman dens", where Doug Rattmann has left scribblings and paintings on walls in hidden rooms. Ratman’s full appearance is only seen in the Portal 2: Lab Rat webcomic released by Valve prior to Portal 2s release to tie the story of the two games together. Ratman is the comic’s main character. Prior to GLaDOS' rampancy and the neurotoxin release, Doug Rattmann was once an Aperture scientist. Already skeptical of the computer, the man fled from the gas and kept himself hidden from GLaDOS' view, slowly becoming more insane over an unknown stretch of time.

The Lab Rat comic reveals that, despite his madness, Doug Rattmann identified Chell as a rejected test subject due to her high tenacity, and moved her to the top of the queue for testing. During events in Portal, he worked behind the scenes to scribble messages and warnings to Chell on the walls, leading her out of the testing chambers and towards GLaDOS. After watching her defeat the computer, he managed to escape the facility, but returned to assure Chell would be put in indefinite cryogenic storage animation after she was dragged back inside, suffering a serious injury (a shot in the leg from a turret) to complete this. In the last panel of the comic, Doug Rattmann places himself in cryogenic storage animation. His fate by the events of Portal 2 is unclear, though more of the Ratman dens can be found.

Among the wall scribblings in the Portal dens is the sentence "The cake is a lie", which became an internet meme. The scribblings also include pastisches of several poems, including W. H. Auden's "Funeral Blues", Emily Brontë's "No Coward Soul Is Mine", Emily Dickinson's "Because I could not stop for Death", and Henry Wadsworth Longfellow's "The Reaper and the Flowers". Among the scribblings there are also pictures of a family watching television in the 1950s, and pictures of portraits of Sam Rayburn, Theodore Roosevelt, and Calvin Coolidge. Doug Rattmann has pasted pictures of companion cubes on their heads.
The dens in Portal 2 contain paintings of Doug Rattmann among the scribblings. In one of those dens, The National's song "Exile Vilify" can be heard from a radio. Some of the song’s lyrics are scribbled on the walls of the den. This song was exclusively written for Portal 2.

Cave Johnson

Cave Johnson was the founder and CEO of the fictional company Aperture Science. He is mentioned in some of the alternative reality game information associated with Portal in describing the history of the company, while his presence in Portal 2 is through pre-recorded messages (voiced by J.K. Simmons) played while the player-character explores the depths of Aperture Science. Based on in-game information, Johnson is shown to have grown frustrated and jealous of his competitors despite receiving significant funding for the company's technology achievements, and slowly lost his mind over the years until his death from moon dust poisoning. It is revealed in Aperture Desk Job through retroactive continuity that, shortly before his death, Johnson’s consciousness was transferred to a computer encased in a clay bust of his own head. Johnson instructs the player to end his suffering by shooting his power source with a newly-invented turret, but this fails as his backup power is activated. However, he plummets into the depths of the Aperture Science facility, where it is assumed he remains for the entirety of the Portal series.

Caroline

Caroline, voiced by Ellen McLain, is Cave Johnson's personal assistant according to the audio recordings heard during the second act of Portal 2. As Johnson's health deteriorated and as he became mentally unstable, Johnson ordered that Caroline be put in charge of the facility. Caroline would ultimately become the personality core of GLaDOS. In the conclusion of Portal 2, GLaDOS, trapped in her potato form, comes to recall the Caroline persona, and accepts this to form a truce with Chell to defeat Wheatley. After their victory, GLaDOS thanks the Caroline persona for her insights, and then promptly deletes the personality.

During early development, Valve had created the "Greg" character to be a straight man to the Cave Johnson character. However, instead of hiring a voice actor for a handful of lines, they decided to economize and reuse McLain (the voice of GLaDOS) to voice the character and naming her Caroline. This gave the creators a new idea of tying the Caroline personality to GLaDOS, and wrote part of Portal 2s story about GLaDOS discovering her human past, using it to succeed, and then immediately forgetting about it by wiping it away. Greg appears as Cave Prime's assistant in the "Perpetual Testing Initiative" update, but is only heard through grunts.

Personality Cores
Aperture Science Personality Constructs, also known as Personality spheres or Personality Cores, are sentient robots created by Aperture that possess their own personalities. Operation and authority over the entire facility is done by a Personality Core known as the Central Core, a role nominally filled by GLaDOS. The Aperture Science facility is capable of limited functionality if the Central Core is removed or disabled.

GLaDOS

GLaDOS (Genetic Lifeform and Disk Operating System) is a rampant artificial intelligence computer system that controls Aperture laboratories, and is the primary antagonist for the Portal series. She is voiced by Ellen McLain. She awakens the player-character Chell in the first game, tasking her through the dangerous testing course, but Chell manages to escape and appears to destroy her, though later revealed to have had her personality stored within a black box. Within the second game, Wheatley accidentally reawakens GLaDOS, and eventually convinces Chell to initiate a core transfer to replace her with himself. GLaDOS, placed into a module powered by a potato battery, is forced to work with Chell to depose Wheatley from power before the Aperture facility is destroyed.

Turrets
Aperture Science Sentry Turrets are sleek, thin stationary robots equipped with machine guns that will fire upon the player upon entering their line of sight. Used as a testing mechanic in Portal and Portal 2, sentry turrets placed in test chambers must be disabled or destroyed in order to progress. Voiced by McLain, turrets possess polite mannerisms in their voice lines, such as  "I don't blame you" or "No hard feelings" after being disabled.

Within Portal 2, a series of malfunctioning turrets known as the Defective Turrets also appear. Voiced by Nolan North, these speak with a Brooklyn accent, acting and tough but incapable of actually firing bullets or causing damage. They are first introduced in the middle of the Portal 2 single-player campaign in a turret quality assurance line sabotage, where Wheatley instructs Chell to use a defective turret as a template for the automated line to accept defective turrets while destroying functional ones.

An individual turret known as the Oracle Turret appears briefly. Due for incineration, the turret will give cryptic premonitions of future events in the game if rescued by the player. After Wheatley seizes control of Aperture Laboratories in Portal 2, he creates the Frankenturret, an amalgamation of weighted cube and turret only capable of walking around aimlessly. In the ending scene of Portal 2, the player is given an opera performance by a choir of turrets.

In a Portal 2 trailer, Cave Johnson describes Aperture Science turrets as being sold in a variety of color schemes to the general public as a home defense item.

Wheatley

Wheatley is one of GLaDOS' Personality Cores, voiced by Stephen Merchant and introduced in Portal 2, where he has become autonomous from GLaDOS. He appears to help rescue Chell from the failing cryogenic storage facility, but inadvertently reactivates GLaDOS. Eventually, Wheatley guides Chell to initiate a core transfer, allowing him to take over GLaDOS' capabilities, turning him corrupt with power and sending Chell and the GLaDOS potato-battery module deep into the bowels of Aperture Science. GLaDOS reveals that Wheatley was designed by Aperture's scientists as "the dumbest moron that ever lived", designed to hamper her decision-making processes. Wheatley's incompetence threatens to destroy Aperture, and Chell and GLaDOS are forced to work together to stop him. At the end of the game, Wheatley is banished to space via a portal on the moon, with a corrupted core orbiting around him.

Personality Cores

Personality Cores, like Wheatley, are portable, self-powered AIs that are spherical, with one eye and two handles. They are modules that were designed by Aperture Science to be installed on GLaDOS to augment her capabilities. Later, as GLaDOS showed signs of threatening to release neurotoxin within the facility, the scientists repurposed the spheres as "AI inhibition technology", designed as a "conscience" to hamper GLaDOS' programming. They are featured in both games.

In Portal, Chell dislodges the existing cores that were installed on GLaDOS, resulting in a malfunction that appears to destroy GLaDOS and release Chell. The four cores featured here are:
the Morality Core was installed onto GLaDOS to inhibit her from flooding the labs with neurotoxin (as she had done before). It accidentally falls off GLaDOS when Chell enters her chamber.
the Curiosity Core kept GLaDOS from killing Chell to watch what she would do. This core constantly asks questions to Chell.
the Intelligence Core reiterates a cake recipe with many unorthodox ingredients, referring to the cake that would be awarded to Chell at the end of the testing course.
the Anger Core, which, instead of speaking, only produces angry snarls and growls.
The Morality Core does not speak in the game. The Curiosity and Intelligence Cores were voiced by McLain, while the Anger Core's raging sounds were voiced by performing artist Mike Patton. Valve has reused these lines for some of Left 4 Deads special infected. At the end of Portal, multiple personality cores are seen waking up in a room that also has the cake in it.

In Portal 2, after Wheatley has taken over the facility, GLaDOS, embedded in a potato on Chell's portal gun, instructs her to install "corrupted" cores on Wheatley to have the computer think he is corrupted, and bring GLaDOS back in charge of Aperture. Here, three cores are featured:
the Space Core talks about space in an obsessive and incoherent manner, eventually being sucked into space with Wheatley. The Space Core has become an Internet meme. A mod published by Valve for the video game Skyrim features the character. The Space Core was inspired by an advert for the Oregon Coast Aquarium. 
the Adventure Core (that calls itself "Rick") acts like a male protagonist archetype and attempts to flirt with Chell.
the Fact Core states random, irrelevant facts with varying accuracy.
All three Cores were voiced by Nolan North, who also voiced the Defective Turrets.

At one stage during Portal 2s development, the writers had envisioned the long-disused Aperture facility to have been taken over by the cores, creating their own microcosms in the game. One core was inspired by the character Red from The Shawshank Redemption played by Morgan Freeman, who would have been completely familiar with every detail of the entirety of a ten-by-ten-foot room, and utterly fascinated by anything outside its sphere of influence. Another core would have been named Quint after the character in Jaws, and considered itself an "AI Hunter" with GLaDOS as his ultimate prey. This concept was eventually dropped, leaving just Wheatley behind, but some of the envisioned cores were brought to the end battle.

ATLAS and P-body

ATLAS and P-body (known as Blue and Orange to GLaDOS) are player characters in the co-op campaign of Portal 2. They are two robots that cannot speak and can only produce grunts, which are voiced by Dee Bradley Baker. They are equipped with their own portal guns which bears the colour of its user (blue and purple for ATLAS, yellow and red for P-body). Atlas and P-Body are described as masculine and feminine, respectively, as stated by Chet Faliszek in an interview.

During the campaign, GLaDOS calls them Blue and Orange, respectively, and constantly tries to ruin their relationship by awarding one and ignoring the other. GLaDOS sends ATLAS and P-body into four areas to access data discs. Once done, they are blown up, as GLaDOS claims it is the only way they can be retrieved from these areas. Later, GLaDOS commands them to retrieve a certain "surprise" in an area. They go in search, only to find hundreds of thousands of other test subjects in suspended animation. After the co-op campaign is finished, GLaDOS quotes that they saved science. ATLAS and P-body begin to celebrate, only to be promptly blown up by GLaDOS.

In the DLC campaign "Peer Review", ATLAS and P-body are reactivated by GLaDOS one week after the original co-op campaign, during which GLaDOS has already wiped out all of the found test subjects in her attempts to turn them into "killing machines". The two robots are sent to find a saboteur that has taken control of a prototype central core and is causing problems in the facility. The saboteur is eventually revealed to be a bird pecking at the console's keyboard, which sends GLaDOS into a panic when she recognizes it as the one who tried to eat her during her time as a potato. ATLAS and P-body manage to shoo away the bird, earning a rare compliment from GLaDOS before she notices eggs in its nest. Instead of having them smashed, GLaDOS has the eggs taken to her chamber so that she can raise the baby birds to be her own little "killing machines".

According to GLaDOS, ATLAS and P-body were created for the Cooperative Testing Initiative and were supposed to phase out human testing after Chell escaped with Wheatley. However, she never got around to using them for testing. In the Portal 2 singleplayer campaign, Wheatley finds both ATLAS and P-body in storage and decided to kill both Chell and GLaDOS and use them instead. They later appear when Chell is granted liberty by GLaDOS.

Originally, the co-op player characters would be Chell (the single player character), and Mel, another human test subject. This concept was cut when playtesting showed that co-op characters would die a lot. The humans were replaced with infinite respawning robots. During the early phases of Portal 2, ATLAS and P-body's concept showed more of a Westworld feel.

Announcer
The Announcer (voiced by Joe Michaels) is a minor character in Portal 2, serving exclusively as a computer-generated voice for system alerts and autonomous operations of Aperture facilities in GLaDOS's absence. Voice announcements by the Announcer guide the player through the initial events of Portal 2.

Testing material

Weighted Companion Cube

Weighted Companion Cubes are variants of Weighted Storage Cubes that are used in the testing chambers. They are differentiated from regular Storage Cubes with small pink hearts on its external surface, instead of an Aperture Science logo.

In Portal, during test chamber 17, Chell is given a Weighted Companion Cube by GLaDOS, told by her that it will be her faithful companion for the duration of the test. Chell must use the Cube to complete the chamber, at which point GLaDOS requires her to incinerate the Cube before being able to progress further. The requirement to incinerate the companion cube originates from test-play of Portal, during which players brought their companion cube with them to later levels, with unexpected impact on game play. Another Companion Cube is seen at the end of the game, standing next to the cake.
In Portal 2, redesigned Weighted Companion Cubes appear in test chamber 7 in chapter 2. GLaDOS fizzles two of them at the start of the test to annoy Chell. Chell is given the option to take a Weighted Companion Cube with her at the end of the test, but if Chell does this, GLaDOS fizzles the Companion Cube before Chell can enter the lift leading to the next test chamber. A Companion Cube with the old design, supposedly the one from Portal, appears at the very end of the game, as it is ejected, charred and singed, from the shed (possibly at ground level) shortly after Chell's departure.
Companion Cubes are also mentioned a lot in the Ratman dens in Portal. In the Lab Rat comic, Ratman is also accompanied by an imaginary Companion Cube, which talks to him.

Since its debut, the Companion Cube has become an internet meme, leading to a large series of merchandise and appearances in various other media.

References
  Content in this article was copied from Announcer at the Portal Wiki, which is licensed under the Creative Commons Attribution 3.0 (Unported) (CC-BY 3.0) license.

Characters
Portal